Koduri Siva Shakthi Datta (born Koduri Subba Rao; 8 October 1932) is an Indian lyricist, screenwriter, and painter who works in Telugu cinema. He is known for writing Sanskrit-based song lyrics in Telugu films. He is the elder brother of screenwriter V. Vijayendra Prasad, father of music director M. M. Keeravani and the uncle of director S. S. Rajamouli.

Early life 
Siva Shakthi Datta was born as Koduri Subbarao on 8 October 1932. His family hails from Kovvur near Rajahmundry in Andhra Pradesh. His father was Koduri Vijaya Apparao. Apparao was a landlord, a contractor and also ran a transport company in Kovvur with 12 buses. Apparao was fond of arts. His second son was Subbarao, who later changed his name to Baburao.

Subbarao was a dropout from intermediate at C. R. Reddy College in Eluru. Inclined towards arts from an early age, he ran away from his home and joined Sir J. J. School of Art in Mumbai. He graduated with a diploma two years later and returned to his native place Kovvur. He started using the pen name Kamalesh as a painter. Subbarao later changed his name to Siva Shakthi Datta. Datta was also interested in music and learned to play guitar, sitar, harmonium.

Career 
Datta's passion for films made him and Prasad to shift to Madras. He assisted a couple of directors for some time and started a film titled Pillanagrovi which was stopped midway due to financial reasons.

Later Prasad got introduced to K. Raghavendra Rao through Samatha Arts’ Mukherjee who was a friend of his. Raghavendra Rao started giving Datta and Prasad small assignments. They got their first break with Janaki Ramudu (1988) which became successful at the box office.

Later, Datta wrote lyrics for various songs in films like Sye, Chatrapathi, Rajanna, Baahubali: The Beginning, Baahubali 2: The Conclusion, RRR.

Personal life 
Datta is the father of music director M. M. Keeravani. Datta has six siblings  an elder brother, an elder sister, and four younger brothers. His younger brother, the screenwriter V. Vijayendra Prasad credits him for his success. Datta is the uncle of director S. S. Rajamouli, and music composer M. M. Srilekha.

Awards 

 IIFA Utsavam

 Nominated for Best Lyricist - Telugu for "Mamathala Thalli" from Baahubali: The Beginning.

Filmography

As screenwriter 

 Janaki Ramudu (1988)

As lyricist

References

External links 

 
 https://www.jiosaavn.com/artist/shiva-shakti-datta-songs/V8Ksuoz-zw4_
 https://nettv4u.com/celebrity/telugu/lyricist/shiva-shakti-datta

1932 births
Telugu-language lyricists
Indian lyricists
Indian songwriters
Telugu poets
Poets from Andhra Pradesh
Living people